Minuscule 698 (in the Gregory-Aland numbering), ε436 (von Soden), is a Greek minuscule manuscript of the New Testament, on parchment. Palaeographically it has been assigned to the 14th century. The manuscript is lacunose. Scrivener labelled it by 602e.

Description 

The codex contains the text of the Gospel of Mark, Gospel of Luke, and  Gospel of John on 186 parchment leaves (size ). Gospel of Matthew is wholly lost. The text is written in one column per page, 19-26 lines per page.

There is also a division according to the Ammonian Sections (in Mark 237, the last section in 16:14), but there are no references to the Eusebian Canons.

According to Scrivener it is "rough and dirty". There are no pictures, but ornamentations in faded lake.

Text 

The Greek text of the codex was not placed by Kurt Aland in any Category.

According to the Claremont Profile Method it represents textual group 22a in Luke 1, Luke 10, and Luke 20.

The text has some omissions supplied by marginal notes.

History 

Scrivener and Gregory dated the manuscript to the 14th century. Currently the manuscript is dated by the INTF to the 14th century.

The manuscript was bought from Sir T. Gage's sale, in 1858.

It was added to the list of New Testament manuscript by Scrivener (602) and Gregory (698).

It was examined by S. T. Bloomfield, Dean Burgon, and William Hatch. Gregory saw the manuscript in 1883.

The manuscript is currently housed at the British Library (Add MS 27861) in London.

See also 

 List of New Testament minuscules
 Biblical manuscript
 Textual criticism

References

Further reading 

 S. T. Bloomfield, Critical Annotations: Additional and Supplementary on the New Testament (1860).
 W. H. P. Hatch, Facsimiles and descriptions of minuscule manuscripts of the New Testament, LXXXI (Cambridge, 1951).

Greek New Testament minuscules
14th-century biblical manuscripts
British Library additional manuscripts